Earth Angel, is a song by American doo-wop group the Penguins

It may also refer to:

 Earth Angel, a 1991 TV movie starring Cindy Williams
 Earth Angel, an episode of the American television series Runaways
 Earth Angel, an episode of the American TV series Married... with Children
 Earth Angels, an episode of the American sitcom sequel The New Leave It to Beaver

See also
 The Earth Angels, a Spanish doo-wop vocal group